Igor Silveira Gomes (born 17 March 1999) is a Brazilian professional footballer who plays as a midfielder for Atlético Mineiro.

Club career

São Paulo
Born in São José do Rio Preto, Gomes played youth football for América-SP and Tanabi, before joining São Paulo FC's academy at the age of 14. In 2018, he took part in the Copa do Brasil Sub-20-winning campaign. On 11 September 2018, his contract was extended until 31 March 2023.

On 26 September 2018, Gomes was promoted to the first team, making his debut as a professional on the following 26 November, as a second-half substitute for Felipe Araruna in a 0–0 draw to Sport in the national league. On 24 March 2019, he scored his first two goals in a 2–1 win over Ituano in the state league.

Atlético Mineiro
On 6 January 2023, Gomes joined Atlético Mineiro on a free transfer and a four-year contract.

International career
Gomes has been capped by Brazil at under-20 level, representing the team at the 2017 Toulon Tournament and the 2019 South American U-20 Championship. With the under-23s, he participated in the 2020 CONMEBOL Pre-Olympic Tournament, helping Brazil clinch qualification for the 2020 Summer Olympics.

Career statistics

Honours
São Paulo
Campeonato Paulista: 2021

References

External links

1999 births
Living people
People from São José do Rio Preto
Brazilian footballers
Footballers from São Paulo (state)
Association football midfielders
Campeonato Brasileiro Série A players
São Paulo FC players
Clube Atlético Mineiro players
Brazil under-20 international footballers
Brazil youth international footballers